Claus Bundgård Christensen (born 1968) is a Danish historian and associate professor at Roskilde University known for his books related to collaboration and crime in Denmark during and following World War II.

In 1998, he, and historians Niels Bo Poulsen and Peter Scharff Smith, published the book  (Under svastika and Dannebrog - Danes in Waffen SS), acclaimed for its non-apologist and detailed description of the Danes who volunteered for service in the Waffen SS on the Eastern front. Their 2016 book  (Waffen-SS: Europe's Nazi soldiers) has been translated to Dutch.

In addition to his World War II era publications, he wrote  (Danes on the Western Front 1914-1918), which also received very positive reviews and won the 'History book of the year' award in 2009.

Since 2010, he has been a reviewer of non-fiction books for Weekendavisen.

Bibliography (selected)

References

External links

 
 

1968 births
20th-century Danish historians
21st-century Danish historians
Danish male writers
Living people
People from Holstebro